Deepti Menon is an Indian author who lives in Thrissur, Kerala. She is the author of Arms and the Woman and Shadow in the Mirror. She was also the contributing author of Crossed and Knotted, which made it to the Limca Book of Records, and A Little Chorus of Love.

Background 
Deepti Menon was born on 7 December 1961, in Pune, India, to Hindu parents. Her father was a lieutenant colonel in the Indian National Army, and her mother, Nalini Chandran, is an academician who founded and runs the Hari Sri Vidya Nidhi School in Thrissur. Deepti is married to Col. Gopinath Menon, and they live in Thrissur. She has a daughter, Priyanka Menon-Rao.

Career 
Deepti Menon began her career as an English teacher for students at middle and high schools. Her work as an author and writer formally began after she wrote Deeparadhana, a compilation of poems, followed by Arms and the Woman in 2002, which was published by Rupa Publications. Later, in 2014, Deepti contributed to two anthologies, 21 Tales to Tell and Chronicles of Urban Nomads, besides writing for Mango Chutney, as well. In 2015, she contributed to Defiant Dreams and When they Spoke. She was also the contributing author of Crossed and Knotted, which made it to the Limca Book of Records.

Selected works 
 Arms and the Woman (2002)
 Deeparadhana (2002)
 Shadow in the Mirror (2016)
 Classic Tales From the Panchatantra (4 books)
 Classic Tales From the Panchatantra (Consolidated Volume)
 Where Shadows Follow -Tales That Twist and Turn
 Shadows Never Lie

Contributing author
 21 Tales to Tell (2014)
 Chronicles of Urban Nomads (2014)
 Mango Chutney (2014)
 Upper Cut (2014)
 Crossed and Knotted (2015)
 Defiant Dreams (2015)
 A Little Chorus of Love (2015)
 When they Spoke (2016)
 Love - Lots of Volatile Emotions
 Rudraksha
 Grandpa Tales
 Tonight Is The Night
 The Naked Indian Woman
 The Readomania Book of Horror
 The Readomania Book of Romance
 The Readomania Book of Folk Tales
 The Readomania Book of Historical Fiction
 The Readomania Book of Indian Mythology

References 

1961 births
Living people
Writers from Chennai
Indian women writers